Death (XIII) is the 13th trump or Major Arcana card in most traditional tarot decks. It is used in tarot card games as well as in divination. The card typically depicts the Grim Reaper, and when used for divination is often interpreted as signifying major changes in a person's life.

Description
Some decks, such as the Tarot of Marseilles and the Visconti Sforza Tarot omit the name from the card, calling it "The Card with No Name", often with the implication of a broader meaning than literal death. There are other decks that title Death as "Rebirth" or "Death-Rebirth."

The Death card usually depicts the Grim Reaper, the personification of Death. In some decks, the Grim Reaper is riding a pale horse, and often he is wielding a sickle or scythe. Surrounding the Grim Reaper are dead and dying people from all classes, including kings, bishops and commoners. The Rider–Waite tarot deck depicts the skeleton carrying a black standard emblazoned with The White Rose of York. 

In the background are two towers and a rising summer.

Examples

Interpretation
According to Eden Gray and other authors on the subject, it is uncommon that this card actually represents a physical death, rather it typically implies an end, possibly of a relationship or interest, and therefore an increased sense of self-awareness.

In fact, Gray interprets this card as a change of thinking from an old way into a new way.  The horse Death is riding is stepping over a prone king, which symbolizes that not even royalty can stop change.

The card, drawn in reverse, can be interpreted as stagnation and the inability to move or change according to Gray.

According to A. E. Waite's 1910 book The Pictorial Key to the Tarot, the Death card carries several divinatory associations:

The Death card is associated with the planet Pluto and Scorpio zodiac sign in astrology.

Other versions

 In the Mythic tarot deck, Death is depicted by Hades.
In the Sun and Moon tarot deck, Death is depicted as a woman bathed in fire with wings. It is titled "Death-Rebirth"
 In the Star Spinner tarot deck, Death is depicted as Nyx holding her child, Thanatos

References

Further reading

 A. E. Waite's 1910 Pictorial Key to the Tarot
 Sir James Frazer The Golden Bough
 Hajo Banzhaf, Tarot and the Journey of the Hero (2000)
 Most works by Joseph Campbell
 The Book of Thoth by Aleister Crowley
 G. Ronald Murphy, S.J., The Owl, The Raven, and The Dove: Religious Meaning of the Grimm's Magic Fairy Tales (2000)
 Riane Eisler, The Chalice and the Blade (1987)
 Mary Greer, The Women of the Golden Dawn (1994)
 Merlin Stone, When God Was A Woman (1976)
 Robert Graves, Greek Mythology (1955)
 Joan Bunning, Learning the Tarot
Juliette Wood, Folklore 109 (1998):15–24, "The Celtic Tarot and the Secret Tradition: A Study in Modern Legend Making" (1998)

Major Arcana
Hades
Nyx
Thanatos